The Greenbrier cavesnail, scientific name Fontigens turritella, is a species of very small or minute freshwater snail with an operculum, an aquatic gastropod mollusk in the family Hydrobiidae. This species is endemic to the United States.

The Greenbrier River Valley (which has many caves), is in West Virginia.

References

 2006 IUCN Red List of Threatened Species.   Downloaded on 7 August 2007.

Molluscs of the United States
Fontigens
Hydrobiidae
Cave snails
Gastropods described in 1976
Taxonomy articles created by Polbot